Euxesta atlantica is a species of ulidiid or picture-winged fly in the genus Euxesta of the family Ulidiidae.

References

atlantica
Insects described in 1995